Zrykh is a rural locality (a selo) in Akhtynsky District, Republic of Dagestan, Russia. The population was 1,839 as of 2010. There are 4 streets.

Geography 
Zrykh is located 18 km northwest of Akhty (the district's administrative centre) by road. Khlyut is the nearest rural locality.

References 

Rural localities in Akhtynsky District